Scaccia (plural: scacce), scacciata or sciachiatta is a stuffed flat bread in Sicilian cuisine. Scaccia is made with a very thin rectangular layer of dough, folded on itself three or four times. It can be stuffed with different ingredients, the more common variations are ricotta cheese and onion, cheese and tomato, tomato and onion, or tomato and eggplant, depending on location, taste, or season. It is baked and can be eaten hot or cold. "Scacciata" derives from the Sicilian word meaning to drive away, equivalent to the Italian word "schiacciata" meaning to crush or to flatten. Scaccia can be found in Ragusa and Siracusa, as well as some Sicilian-American communities (namely Middletown, Connecticut).

History 
The dish was born at the end of the seventeenth century as a basic dish of peasant tables. In Sicily the recipe was handed down and expanded according to the culinary voices of the time. In the rural tables of the Kingdom of Sicily and then Kingdom of the Two Sicilies, this simple dish was developed based on bread, vegetables and meat, often the leftovers of a hearty dinner or a recurring lunch. Oltremodo appeared on Sicilian tables at the beginning of the 18th century with the recipe based on vegetables and potatoes. It achieved its success when Moncada himself, prince of Paternò, in 1763, wanted it on his table during the Christmas celebrations. Since then, tradition has placed it as a Christmas dish with a recipe handed down for generations. To date, the scaccia has a wide diffusion in the Sicilian territory and a significant artisanal marketing.

See also
 List of Sicilian dishes
 List of stuffed dishes
Stromboli

References

Cuisine of Sicily
Flatbread dishes
Province of Ragusa
Savoury pies
Stuffed dishes
Street food in Italy